Mianwali Division is an administrative division of Punjab province, Pakistan. Mianwali city is the capital of the division. According to the 2017 Census of Pakistan, the total population of the division was 8.18 million.  

On January 14, 2023, CM Pervaiz Elahi announced that Mianwali District upgraded to Divisional status..

Administration 

 Bhakkar District
 Mianwali District
 Talagang District

References 

Divisions of Punjab, Pakistan